Mansour Savad-Abadi Mahdizadeh (born 14 August 1938) is a retired Iranian freestyle wrestler who won world titles in 1961, 1962 and 1965. He competed at the 1960, 1964 and 1968 Olympics with the best result of fourth place in 1964.

Mehdizadeh was a major in the Iranian Army. He married in March 1965. After retiring from competitions he worked as a national wrestling coach.

References

1938 births
Living people
Olympic wrestlers of Iran
Wrestlers at the 1960 Summer Olympics
Wrestlers at the 1964 Summer Olympics
Wrestlers at the 1968 Summer Olympics
Iranian male sport wrestlers
Asian Games gold medalists for Iran
Asian Games medalists in wrestling
Pahlevans of Iran
Wrestlers at the 1966 Asian Games
World Wrestling Championships medalists
Medalists at the 1966 Asian Games
20th-century Iranian people
21st-century Iranian people
World Wrestling Champions